Relicord is an initiative by the Reliance Industries in the field of biotechnological advancement. It is established as a part of the subsidiary of Reliance Industries, Reliance Life Sciences. ReliCord is the first to have a registered cord blood bank and repository in India as well as the entire region of South East Asia. In terms of Biotechnology India is currently amongst the top five countries in the Asia Pacific region. Reliance Life Sciences and ReliCord are an endeavour by the Reliance Group to tap into this emerging market that has great potential.

About Relicord 
ReliCord has already stored over 3,500 cord blood samples at its repository. It conforms to the AABB and USFDA guidelines and has an infrastructure to collect cord blood from any corner of the country through its collection centres. ReliCord offers public as well as private banking and is the only facility in India that offers stem cell research for current and future applications. The cord blood samples are stored at the Dhirubhai Ambani Life Sciences Centre (DALC) campus in Navi Mumbai. The repository is completely automated and uses the most advanced technology under the supervision of a host of experienced scientists. 

In 2002 Reliance Industries Limited has established blood banking service under Relicord.

Social view 
ReliCord runs three programs for the collection of cord blood: ReliCord S, ReliCord A and ReliCord M. ReliCord S and ReliCord A offer stem cell enriched cord blood repository services as well as stem cell enriched cord blood for transplantation to address haematological disorders. ReliCord S is a program for sibling donors. This program is for a mother or a family that wants to process and bank the umbilical cord blood stem cells from the present pregnancy. Only family members waiting for transplantation can utilize this program. Under ReliCord S the stored cord blood stem cells can be used for haematopoetic stem cell transplantation for family members suffering from diseases such as thalassemia or leukemia. The ReliCord S and A program not only stores the stem cells but also tests and processes the same along with delivering the stem cells to the transplant site as per the direction received from the transplant physician.

Research 
ReliCord A is meant for patients who require transplants with grafts from the repository. Under this program a patient first has to obtain his HLA profile to facilitate the availability of the graft. HLA profiling is also offered by Reliance Life Sciences. ReliCord M offers umbilical cord banking and cord tissue derived mesenchymal stem cells banking services as a combined storage service for parents-to-be. The Relicord M program offers umbilical cord collection, processing of the cord, culturing of mesenchymal stem cells and storage of cord tissue with 15 million stem cells. Before storage the cord blood is tested for HIV, HBV, HCV and CMV. The blood is also typed for Human Leukocyte Antigens (HLA) Class 1 and 2 antigens before processing. The stem cell enriched cord blood is then cryo-preserved at the repository at a temperature of minus 196 degrees Celsius. Stem cell enriched cord blood can be used as a therapy for the treatment of thalassemia, leukemia, brain tumor, meuroblastoma and sickle cell anaemia and can be used as an adjunct therapy for chemotherapy.

References

External links
 

Blood banks in India
Companies based in Mumbai
Reliance Industries subsidiaries
Health care companies of India
Reliance Life Sciences
2001 establishments in Maharashtra
Indian companies established in 2001